Voudouris is a surname. Notable people with the surname include:

Dimitri Voudouris (born 1961), Greek electronic musician and composer
Michael Voudouris (born 1960), American-born Greek skeleton racer
Roger Voudouris (1954–2003), American singer-songwriter and guitarist

Greek-language surnames